Archibald Frank Gomm (1 May 1897 – 1978) was an English footballer who played in the Football League for Carlisle United and Millwall.

References

1897 births
1978 deaths
English footballers
Association football defenders
English Football League players
Chesham United F.C. players
Wycombe Wanderers F.C. players
Reading F.C. players
Millwall F.C. players
Carlisle United F.C. players
Lancaster City F.C. players